Events in the year 1958 in Brazil.

Incumbents

Federal government
 President: Juscelino Kubitschek
 Vice President: João Goulart

Governors 
 Alagoas: Sizenando Nabuco de Melo (until 24 January); Sebastião Muniz Falcão (from 24 January)
 Amazonas: Plínio Ramos Coelho 
 Bahia: Antônio Balbino 
 Ceará: Paulo Sarasate (until 3 July) Flávio Marcílio (from 3 July)
 Espírito Santo: Francisco Lacerda de Aguiar
 Goiás: José Ludovico de Almeida 
 Maranhão: 
 Mato Grosso: João Ponce de Arruda
 Minas Gerais: José Francisco Bias Fortes 
 Pará: Magalhães Barata 
 Paraíba: Flávio Coutinho (until 4 January); Pedro Gondim (from 4 January)
 Paraná: Moisés Lupion
 Pernambuco: Osvaldo Cordeiro de Farias (until 14 November); Otávio Correia de Araújo (from 14 November)
 Piauí: Jacob Gaioso e Almendra 
 Rio de Janeiro: Miguel Couto Filho (until 2 July); Togo Barros (from 2 July)                                                        
 Rio Grande do Norte: Dinarte de Medeiros Mariz 
 Rio Grande do Sul: Ildo Meneghetti 
 Santa Catarina: Jorge Lacerda (until 16 June); Heriberto Hülse (from 16 June)
 São Paulo: Jânio Quadros 
 Sergipe: Leandro Maciel

Vice governors
 Alagoas: Sizenando Nabuco de Melo 
 Ceará: Wilson Gonçalves 
 Espírito Santo: Adwalter Ribeiro Soares
 Goiás: Bernardo Sayão Carvalho Araújo 
 Maranhão: Alexandre Alves Costa 
 Mato Grosso: Henrique José Vieira Neto 
 Minas Gerais: Artur Bernardes Filho 
 Paraíba: Pedro Gondim 
 Pernambuco: Otávio Correia de Araújo (until 14 November); vacant thereafter (from 14 November)
 Piauí: Francisco Ferreira de Castro 
 Rio de Janeiro: Roberto Silveira
 Rio Grande do Norte: José Augusto Varela 
 Santa Catarina: Heriberto Hülse (until 16 June); vacant thereafter (from 16 June)
 São Paulo: Porfírio da Paz 
 Sergipe: José Machado de Souza

Establishments 
 Construction of the Basilica of St. Joseph the Worker, Barbacena was completed.

Events

June 
 June 29 - Brazil defeats Sweden 5–2 to win the 1958 FIFA World Cup Final in Sweden. It is the first time Brazil wins the FIFA World Cup.

Births
 September 14 – Silas Malafaia, evangelical pastor, author, and televangelist

Deaths

References

See also 
1958 in Brazilian football
1958 in Brazilian television

 
1950s in Brazil
Years of the 20th century in Brazil
Brazil
Brazil